The 1935 Chicago White Sox season was the team's 35th season in the major leagues, and its 36th season overall. They finished with a record of 74–78, good enough for 5th place in the American League, 19.5 games behind the first place Detroit Tigers.

Offseason 
 November 21, 1934: Billy Sullivan, Phil Gallivan and $20,000 were traded by the White Sox to the Indianapolis Indians for George Washington.

Regular season

Season standings

Record vs. opponents

Roster

Player stats

Batting

Starters by position 
Note: Pos = Position; G = Games played; AB = At bats; H = Hits; Avg. = Batting average; HR = Home runs; RBI = Runs batted in

Other batters 
Note: G = Games played; AB = At bats; H = Hits; Avg. = Batting average; HR = Home runs; RBI = Runs batted in

Pitching

Starting pitchers 
Note: G = Games pitched; IP = Innings pitched; W = Wins; L = Losses; ERA = Earned run average; SO = Strikeouts

Other pitchers 
Note: G = Games pitched; IP = Innings pitched; W = Wins; L = Losses; ERA = Earned run average; SO = Strikeouts

Relief pitchers 
Note: G = Games pitched; W = Wins; L = Losses; SV = Saves; ERA = Earned run average; SO = Strikeouts

Farm system

Notes

References 
1935 Chicago White Sox at Baseball Reference

Chicago White Sox seasons
Chicago White Sox season
Chicago White